Sigvard Arne Eklund (19 June 1911 – 30 January 2000) was Director General of the International Atomic Energy Agency from 1961 to 1981.

Career
Eklund was born in Kiruna, Norrbotten County, Sweden, the son of train driver Severin Eklund and his wife Vilhelmina (née Pettersson). Eklund obtained his Master of Science degree in 1936, a Licentiate of Philosophy (fil.lic.) degree in 1941 and a Doctor of Philosophy (fil.dr.) degree from Uppsala University in 1946. He was Docent in nuclear physics at the Royal Institute of Technology and an employee of the Royal Swedish Academy of Sciences Institute of Physics (Vetenskapsakademiens forskningsinstitut för fysik) from 1937 to 1945. Eklund was an associate professor ("laborator") at the Swedish National Defence Research Institute (FOA) from 1945 to 1950 and became director of research at the Swedish Atomic Energy Company (AB Atomenergi, Stockholm) in 1950. He became technical director there in 1957 and  led the effort to build Sweden's first research reactor, R1.

In 1957, he was Secretary General for the Second International United Nations Conference on the Peaceful Uses of Atomic Energy. He was appointed as Director General of the International Atomic Energy Agency in 1961. Eklund was reappointed four more times in 1965, 1969, 1974 and 1977, holding the post for twenty consecutive years until he retired and was named Director General Emeritus.

Eklund became a member of the Swedish National Commission for Physics (Svenska nationalkommissionen för fysik) in 1947 and a member of the Royal Swedish Academy of Engineering Sciences in 1953. He became an honorary doctor in Graz in 1968, in Kraków 1971 and in Bucharest in 1971. Eklund became a member of the Royal Swedish Academy of Sciences in 1972 and honorary doctor of technology at Chalmers University of Technology in 1974 and at the Columbia University in 1977. He became an honorary doctor in Moscow in 1977 and in Buenos Aires in 1977. Eklund became an honorary doctor of technology in Budapest in 1977, an honorary senator at the University of Vienna in 1977, an honorary doctor of technology in Dresden in 1978, at the Yonsei University in Seoul in 1978, at the National Agrarian University in Peru in 1979 and at the Royal Institute of Technology in Stockholm in 1980. Eklund became a member of the National Academy of Engineering in United States in 1979.

He received the American Atoms for Peace Award in 1968.

Personal life
In 1941 he married adjunct lecturer Anna-Greta Johansson (born 1915), the daughter of merchant Algot Johansson and his wife Ester (née Sundkvist). After retiring, Eklund resided in Vienna, Austria until he died in 2000.

References

1911 births
2000 deaths
People from Kiruna Municipality
Academic staff of the KTH Royal Institute of Technology
Uppsala University alumni
Directors General of the International Atomic Energy Agency
Members of the Royal Swedish Academy of Engineering Sciences
Members of the Royal Swedish Academy of Sciences
Atoms for Peace Award recipients